Game Over is the third studio album by Nigerian duo P-Square. The first single from the album was "Do Me". A video for the single was also released along with videos for "No One Like You", "Roll It", "More Than A Friend" and "Ifunanya". However, the most successful single was "No One Like You" which stayed at number 1 on the charts for almost 4 weeks until it was knocked down to number 2 by Mo Hits All Stars' "Pere". On 1 May 2007, the album was released on iTunes.

Singles 
 "No One Like You" was released as one of the album's singles. According to Forbes' 40 Most Powerful Celebrities in Africa article, the song has been viewed over 10 million times on YouTube. The music video for the "No One Like You" was shot and directed by the duo's elder brother, Jude Engees Okoye. The song received the most airplay from the album. Wale did a remix to the song in 2011. In 2010, Ugandan reggae duo Radio and Weasel released a song entitled "Zuena"; the song sampled "No One Like You".
 "Do Me" features vocals from Waje, an artist popularly known for her vocals on M.I's "One Naira". The music video for the single was shot in South Africa by Jude Engees Okoye. In a video interview posted on YouTube, P-Square said they spent more money shooting "Do Me" and less on "Beautiful Onyinye".
 The music video for "More Than A Friend" was shot and directed in South Africa by Jude Engees Okoye. The song describes a guy asking the girl he loves to be "more than a friend".
 The music video for "Ifunanya" was shot and directed in South Africa by Jude Engees Okoye. In the Igbo language, "Ifunanya" loosely means "love inspires love". The word is a fusion of "Ife" (love) and "funánya" (one who inspires love).
 "Roll It" was produced by Northside Entertainment and features recording artist, Alaye. The music video for "Roll It" was also shot and directed by Jude Engees Okoye.

Track listing 

Notes
 "—" denotes an instrumental

Personnel 
 Peter Okoye – Recording artist
 Paul Okoye – Recording artist
 Aituaje Iruobe – Featured artist
 Alaye – Featured artist
 Jude Engees Okoye – Director

Re-release history

References

External links 
 Official P-Square website with songlyrics and wallpaper downloads

2007 albums
P-Square albums
Igbo-language albums
2007 in Nigerian music